Shah Mahmud (also Romanized as Shāh Maḩmūd and Shah Mahmood; also known as Shāh Maḩmūd-e Pā’īn and Maḩmūdābād) is a village in Jolgeh-e Mazhan Rural District, Jolgeh-e Mazhan District, Khusf County, South Khorasan Province, Iran. At the 2006 census, its population was 25, in 7 families.

References 

Populated places in Khusf County